Santa Rosa del Sara Airport  is an airstrip serving the town of Santa Rosa del Sara (de) in the Santa Cruz Department of Bolivia. The runway is on the northwest corner of the town.

See also

Transport in Bolivia
List of airports in Bolivia

References

External links 
OpenStreetMap - Santa Rosa del Sara
OurAirports - Santa Rosa del Sara
Fallingrain - Santa Rosa del Sara Airport

Airports in Santa Cruz Department (Bolivia)